This is a list of members of the Tasmanian House of Assembly, elected at the 1979 state election:

 Labor MHA Eric Barnard resigned on 7 August 1979. Bill McKinnon was elected on the resulting countback.
 The results of the 1979 state election in the seat of Denison were overturned by the Supreme Court of Tasmania on 18 December 1979. A by-election was thus held on 16 February 1980. Five members were re-elected, but Labor MHA John Green and Liberal MHA Bob Baker lost their seats to Democrat Norm Sanders and Liberal Gabriel Haros.
 Labor MHA Neil Batt resigned on 29 August 1980. Bob Graham was elected in the resulting countback.
 Labor Premier Doug Lowe was deposed by his caucus on 11 November 1981 and replaced by Harry Holgate. Lowe and fellow Labor MHA Mary Willey immediately resigned from the party in protest and served out their term as an independents.

Members of Tasmanian parliaments by term
20th-century Australian politicians